is a Japanese actress and voice actress who is affiliated with Seinenza Theater Company.

Performances

Filmography
1984
Heavy Metal L-Gaim (Pamela Piloledge)
Mīmu Iro Iro Yume no Tabi
Urusei Yatsura
1985
Mobile Suit Zeta Gundam (Rosamia Badam)
1986
Animated Classics of Japanese Literature
Dirty Pair: Project Eden (Secretary)
Mobile Suit Gundam ZZ (Emary Ounce)
Uchūsen Sagittarius
1987
Grimm's Fairy Tale Classics (Snow White)
Metal Armor Dragonar (Linda Plato)
1988
Mashin Hero Wataru (Seiryuu-hime)
Ronin Warriors (Kayura's mother)
1989
Jushin Liger (Saeko Yagami)
Madō King Granzort (Bus Guide)
Mobile Suit Gundam 0080: War in the Pocket (Caster)
1990
Mashin Hero Wataru 2 (Seiryuu-hime)
1991
The Brave Fighter of Sun Fighbird
1992
Jeanie with the Light Brown Hair (Linda)
1993
Little Women II: Jo's Boys (Mary-Ann)
The Wind in the Willows
1994
Huckleberry Finn Monogatari (Sophia)
Tico of the Seven Seas
1995
Juu Senshi Garukiba (Melody; Miru Kamijou)
Romeo's Blue Skies (Jessica)
1996
Detective Conan (Kana Misaki)
The Life and Adventures of Santa Claus
1997
Detective Conan: The Time Bombed Skyscraper (Kana Misaki)
Chūka Ichiban!

Game roles
Another Century's Episode (Linda Plato)
Final Fantasy X (Belgemine)
Super Robot Wars series (Rosamia Badam, Emary Ounce)

Dubbing
Backdraft
Charmed (Patty Halliwell)
Crazy Like a Fox
Dae Jang Geum
Diagnosis: Murder
Henry Fool (Fay Grim)
Nash Bridges
The Mothman Prophecies
What I Like About You (Lauren)

References

External links

1961 births
Japanese voice actresses
Living people